The Queer Lion is the trophy awarded yearly since 2007 to the “Best Movie with LGBT Themes & Queer Culture” among those presented during the Venice International Film Festival.

History
The idea of the Queer Lion comes from a 2003 interview, made by president of CinemArte association Daniel N. Casagrande for monthly magazine Venezia News, to then-Director of the Venice Film Festival Moritz De Hadeln. During that, Casagrande asked Mr. De Hadeln if the Venice Film Festival would have welcomed an award meant to specifically honor gay-themed movies, the same way Berlin International Film Festival had done 20 years earlier (with Teddy Bear Award). Although the answer was a positive one, the changing of the Festival’s director the following year caused a delay in the development of the project, which was greenlighted by the new director Marco Müller, who declared his will to back and sustain the creation of such a new collateral award.

All the movies containing LGBTQ themes, stories, plots, or characters, presented in any of the sections of the Venice Film Festival are considered eligible for the award.  Specifically, these sections are: Concorso (Competition), Fuori Concorso (Out of Competition), Orizzonti (Horizons), Controcampo italiano (Italian Reverse Shot), Giornate degli Autori (Venice Days), and Settimana Internazionale della Critica (International Critics' Week).

The Queer Lion jury, composed of journalists, directors, critics, persons with a deep knowledge of cinema, views all the movies deemed to contain noteworthy LGBTQ elements during the Venice Film Festival, picking the "best film" among them.

Award

References

External links

Italian film awards
LGBT culture in Italy
LGBT film awards
Venice Film Festival
Lions in popular culture